The women's singles competition at the 2014 Asian Games in Incheon was held on 24 September 2014 at Anyang Hogye Gymnasium.

Schedule
All times are Korea Standard Time (UTC+09:00)

Results

References 

Results at ABF Website

External links
Official website

Women's singles